Deanna Maree “Violet” Coco, (born 1989 or 1990) usually known as Violet Coco, is an Australian climate activist who was briefly jailed on remand for blocking the Sydney Harbour Bridge in 2022.  She successfully appealed her 15-month jail convicion in March 2023, after the judge found that her conviction was based on false information from the police about an ambulance being blocked by her protest.

Activism 

Coco is affiliated with Fireproof Australia and Extinction Rebellion. The 2019–20 Australian bushfire season motivated Coco to shift focus from her events management business and towards climate change activism.

On 13 April 2022, she blocked one lane of traffic on the Sydney Harbour Bridge as part of a protest drawing attention to climate change. Her arrest for the protest was her 21st arrest.

In December 2022, Coco was found guilty of breaking traffic laws and misusing a safety flare and sentenced by Magistrate Allison Hawkins to 15 months in jail. The severity of the sentence was criticised by Clément Nyaletsossi Voule, the United Nations special rapporteur on peaceful assembly, and by Human Rights Watch. David Ritter, chief executive of Greenpeace Australia Pacific, also condemned the penalty and the new legislation that enabled it, which he described as “rushed through in a chilling and knee-jerk response to ongoing peaceful protests”.  Coco alleges New South Wales Police mistreatment during her arrest and detention.

Coco was held at Silverwater Correctional Centre, New South Wales, Australia. On 13 December 2022, over 100 protestors gathered outside the District Court of New South Wales anticipating Coco's appeal hearing. That same day, she was released from jail on bail as she prepared to appeal her sentencing. Bail conditions prohibit her from being within one kilometre of the Sydney Harbour Bridge. Her appeal of the 15-month jail sentence was successful in mid March 2023, after the judge concluded evidence of an ambulance being blocked at the protest was falsely presented by New South Wales Police. The two charges for resisting arrest and using a flare as an unauthorised explosive remained on her record.

In popular culture 
Coco featured in a painting by Lesley Fitzpatrick selected for the satirical Bald Archy Prize Exhibition in 2023, titled This is Coal – Don't be Afraid, Don't be Scared'. Fitzpatrick's painting satirises the Australian government's inaction on climate change while depicting the 2019–20 Australian bushfire season and a 2021 climate protest during which Coco set fire to an empty pram outside Parliament House. A First Dog on the Moon cartoon depicted Violet Coco's 2022 imprisonment.

Personal life 

In 2019, Coco was the owner-operator of an events management company. She is the niece of New South Wales state minister Alister Henskens, who recently voted in support of the antiprotest legislation used to convict Coco. Coco was aged 32years in 2022.

References

External links 

 Violet Coco - Instagram

Living people
Australian activists
Climate activists
People from Sydney
Year of birth missing (living people)